Niaosong District is a rural district of Kaohsiung City, Taiwan.

History
After the handover of Taiwan from Japan to the Republic of China in 1945, Niaosong was organized as a rural township of Kaohsiung County. On 25 December 2010, Kaohsiung County was merged with Kaohsiung City and Niaosong was upgraded to a district of the city.

Geography
It has 44,238 inhabitants in 2023 Jamnuary.

Administrative divisions
The district consists of Diaosong, Mengli, Dahua, Dipu, Renmei, Dazhu and Huamei Village.

Government institutions
 Radiation Monitoring Center

Education
 Cheng Shiu University

Tourist attractions
 Chengcing Lake
 Chengcing Lake Baseball Stadium
 Dharma Drum Mountain Zi Yun Temple (法鼓山紫云寺)
 Kaohsiung Grand Hotel
 Niaosong Wetland Park

Notable natives
 Huang Shihui, writer

See also
 District (Taiwan)

References

External links

 

Districts of Kaohsiung